Elena Nikolayevna Prokofeva (born 13 March 1971) is a Russian para table tennis player. She won the gold medal in the women's C11 event at the 2020 Summer Paralympics held in Tokyo, Japan.  She is a multitude World and European champion.

Prokofeva has a daughter, Katerina, and two sons, Valery and Lev.

References

External links
Elena Prokofeva at IPTTC

Living people
1971 births
Russian female table tennis players
Paralympic table tennis players of Russia
Paralympic gold medalists for Russia
Paralympic medalists in table tennis
Table tennis players at the 2020 Summer Paralympics
Medalists at the 2020 Summer Paralympics
Sportspeople from Dushanbe
Paralympic gold medalists for the Russian Paralympic Committee athletes
20th-century Russian women
21st-century Russian women